The Copa Chile 1975 was the 7th edition of the Chilean Cup tournament. The competition started on March 27, 1975 and concluded on November 19, 1975. Palestino won the competition for the first time, beating Lota Schwager 4-0 on the final.

Calendar

Preliminary round

|}

First round

|}

Round of 16

|}

Quarterfinals

|}

Semifinals

Final

Top goalscorer
Alberto Hidalgo (Palestino) 6 goals

See also
 1975 Campeonato Nacional
 Primera B

References
Revista Estadio, (Santiago, Chile) March–November 1975 (scores & information)
Diario La Tercera, (Santiago, Chile) October–November 1975
RSSSF

Copa Chile
Chile
1975